K-Rock may refer to:

Arts, entertainment, and media
Korean rock, rock music from Korea

Musicians/bands
 K-Rock, an American rapper from Memphis, Tennessee who has worked with artist like Kingpin Skinny Pimp and the American rap group Three 6 Mafia.

Radio
K-Rock (radio), a common brand of radio stations

Sports facilitates
Rogers K-Rock Centre, a sports and entertainment venue in Kingston, Ontario, Canada